Archaeron is a role-playing game published by Archaeron Games Ltd. in 1980.

Description
Archaeron is a fantasy system similar to Chivalry & Sorcery, for which only two rulebooks were ever published.

Mage, the first book, is a fantasy magic system with complex rules for spellcasting, creation of magician characters, and various types of magic and spells. There are three types of spellcasters: Psychics (divided into Mediums, Seers, and Natural Psychics); Magic Users (Conjurers, Thaumaturges, and Enchanters); and Theurgists ("cleric" types: Symbolists, Mystics, and Necromancers).

Warrior, the second book, is a fantasy combat system for medieval European-style combat, with rules for creation of warrior characters; detailed weapon skills; melee, missile, and mounted combat; wounds and healing; etc.

Publication history
Archaeron was designed by Wilf K. Backhaus and published by Archaeron Games Ltd. in 1980 as the digest-sized 48-page book Mage. The digest-sized 48-page book Warrior was written by Backhaus with Jan Vrapcenak and Richard Fietz, and published by Archaeron Games Ltd. in 1981.

Reception

Reviews
 Different Worlds #28 (April, 1983)

References

Fantasy role-playing games
Role-playing games introduced in 1980